The Panamanian climbing rat (Tylomys panamensis) is a species of rodent in the family Cricetidae. It is endemic to Panama.

References

Literature cited
Alston, E. R. 1882. Biologia centrali-americana. Mammalia. R.H. Porter, 220 pp.
Musser, G. G. and M. D. Carleton. 2005. Superfamily Muroidea. pp. 894–1531 in Mammal Species of the World a Taxonomic and Geographic Reference. D. E. Wilson and D. M. Reeder eds. Johns Hopkins University Press, Baltimore.

Tylomys
Rodents of Central America
Mammals described in 1873
Taxonomy articles created by Polbot